Harry Holt is the name or nickname of:
 Harry Holt (footballer) (1889–1956), Welsh association football player
 Harry Holt (1904–1964), American who with his wife Bertha co-founded Holt International Children's Services, a child welfare NGO
 Harry Holt (gridiron football) (born 1957), American who played in both the National and Canadian Football Leagues
 Harry Holt (Tarzan), a character in four Tarzan films
 Harold Holt (1908–1967), nicknamed "Harry", Australian Prime Minister

See also
Henry Holt (disambiguation)